Alan S. Robertson (born April 10, 1941) is an American lawyer, and retired Republican politician and judge.  He was a member of the Wisconsin State Assembly for three terms, and was an appointed Wisconsin Circuit Court judge in Trempealeau County.

Biography
Robertson was born in Beloit, Wisconsin, on April 10, 1941. He graduated from Beloit Memorial High School and attended the University of Wisconsin-Madison and the University of Wisconsin Law School, earning his Bachelor's degree and Juris Doctor. Robertson is married with three children and has served as a scoutmaster with the Boy Scouts of America.

Career
After being admitted to the State Bar of Wisconsin, Robertson went to work as an assistant district attorney in Trempealeau County, Wisconsin.  In 1969, he was also elected City Attorney for Blair, Wisconsin, and town attorney for the town of Preston.

In 1971, four-term incumbent state representative John Q. Radcliffe resigned to accept a role in the new governor's administration.  Robertson ran and was elected in the special election to replace him in the 1971-1972 session of the legislature.  He served on the committees on taxation and printing, but lost his bid for re-election in 1972.

In 1979, another opportunity in the legislature presented itself when incumbent state representative Steve Gunderson resigned his seat to accept a role on the staff of congressman Toby Roth.  Robertson ran again and defeated former state representative John Q. Radcliffe in the September special election.  He ultimately won one more term in the assembly, narrowly defeating Democrat Rodney C. Moen in 1980, before losing re-election in 1982 to Barbara Gronemus after redistricting.

Robertson resumed his law practice, but returned to public service one more time, in 1994, when Governor Tommy Thompson appointed him to the Wisconsin circuit court in Tremplealeau County to fill the vacancy created by the resignation of Judge Richard Galstad.  He ran for a full term on the court in April 1995, but was defeated.

Electoral history

Wisconsin Assembly Jackson–Trempealeau District (1971)

| colspan="6" style="text-align:center;background-color: #e9e9e9;"| Republican Primary Election, March 2, 1971

| colspan="6" style="text-align:center;background-color: #e9e9e9;"| Special Election, April 6, 1971

Wisconsin Assembly 91st District (1972)

| colspan="6" style="text-align:center;background-color: #e9e9e9;"| Special Election, November 7, 1972

Wisconsin Assembly 91st District (1979, 1980)

| colspan="6" style="text-align:center;background-color: #e9e9e9;"| Republican Primary Election, August 21, 1979

| colspan="6" style="text-align:center;background-color: #e9e9e9;"| Special Election, September 11, 1979

| colspan="6" style="text-align:center;background-color: #e9e9e9;"| Republican Primary Election, September 9, 1980

| colspan="6" style="text-align:center;background-color: #e9e9e9;"| General Election, November 4, 1980

Wisconsin Assembly 43rd District (1982)

| colspan="6" style="text-align:center;background-color: #e9e9e9;"| Republican Primary Election, September 14, 1982

| colspan="6" style="text-align:center;background-color: #e9e9e9;"| General Election, November 2, 1982

Wisconsin Circuit Court (1995)

| colspan="6" style="text-align:center;background-color: #e9e9e9;"| Primary Election, February 21, 1995

| colspan="6" style="text-align:center;background-color: #e9e9e9;"| General Election, April 4, 1995

References

Politicians from Beloit, Wisconsin
People from Trempealeau County, Wisconsin
Republican Party members of the Wisconsin State Assembly
Wisconsin lawyers
University of Wisconsin–Madison alumni
University of Wisconsin Law School alumni
1941 births
Living people